Long form or longform may refer to:

A variety of improvisational theatre
A type of census questionnaire
Form 1040, an American income tax form
Long form journalism

See also
Short form (disambiguation)